The 1979 season was the Hawthorn Football Club's 55th season in the Victorian Football League and 78th overall. Hawthorn entered the season as the defending VFL Premiers. This was the first time since 1973 Hawthorn didn't qualify for finals.

Fixture

Premiership season

Ladder

References

Hawthorn Football Club seasons